Yakacık is a Turkish place name, and it may refer to:

Yakacık, Çivril
Yakacık, Ergani
Yakacık, Hatay, commonly referred to as Payas, a city in Payas district of Hatay Province. 
Yakacık, Beşiri, a village in Beşiri district of Batman Province
Yakacık, Gazipaşa, a village in Gazipaşa district of Antalya Province
Yakacık, Kartal, a neighborhood of Kartal district in Istanbul Province
Yakacık, Merzifon, a village in Merzifon district of Amasya Province
Yakacık, Söğüt, a village in Söğüt district of Bilecik Province